Warrenton Historic District is a national historic district located at Warrenton, Warren County, North Carolina.  The district encompasses 202 contributing buildings in the central business district and surrounding residential sections of Warrenton.  The district developed between about 1840 and 1926, and includes notable examples of Early Republic, Greek Revival, and Late Victorian architecture.  Notable buildings include the Falkener House, Macon Street House, Peter Davis Store, Jones-Cook House (c. 1810), Eaton Place (1843), Sommerville-Graham House (c. 1850) by Jacob W. Holt, Presbyterian Church also by Holt, Baptist Church, Methodist Episcopal Church, Miles Hardware Store, Warrenton City Hall, Warrenton Hotel, John Graham School, and the U.S. Post Office.

It was listed on the National Register of Historic Places in 1976.

References

External links
Warrenton Historic District Commission

Historic American Buildings Survey in North Carolina
Historic districts on the National Register of Historic Places in North Carolina
Greek Revival architecture in North Carolina
Victorian architecture in North Carolina
Buildings and structures in Warren County, North Carolina
National Register of Historic Places in Warren County, North Carolina